Events in the year 1846 in Brazil.

Incumbents
 Monarch – Pedro II.

Events

Births

 July 29 - Isabel, Princess Imperial of Brazil.

Deaths

References

 
1840s in Brazil
Years of the 19th century in Brazil
Brazil
Brazil